The administrative divisions of the Sasanian Empire were administrative divisions of the state organisation of the Sasanian Empire.

Administration 

On his coinage, the first Sasanian King of Kings (shahanshah) Ardashir I, introduces himself as King of Kings of a realm that he identified as Eran. His son and successor Shapur I calls himself King of Kings of Eran and Aneran in his SKZ inscription. According to the inscription, Eran was made up of the following provinces (shahr in Middle Persian):

A similar list is mentioned in the Ka'ba-ye Zartosht of the 3rd-century Zoroastrian priest Kartir. The provinces of the late Sasanian realm are listed in the Bundahishn and Vendidad. Provinces were split into smaller administrative divisions, particularly the khwarrah (same origin as the Iranian/Zoroastrian concept khwarrah, "glory/fortune"), rostag or tasug (districts), and dehs (villages). These divisions were not always used all over the realm, and records of other units are known, such as an awestam, which was ostensibly akin to a shahr and was administered by an awestamdar.

During the reforms of Kavad I and his son and successor Khosrow I, the provinces were grouped into four frontier regions (kusts), with a marshal (spahbed) in charge of each district; a chancery was also added to keep the soldiers equipped. Before Kavad and Khosrow's reforms, the Iranians' general (Eran-spahbed) managed the empire's army. A new priestly office was also created known as the "advocate and judge of the poor" (driyōšān jādag-gōw ud dādwar), which assisted the clergy to help the poor and underprivileged (an obligation they had possibly ignored previously).

Hierarchical list of Sasanian administrators and their level of authority
According to modern historian Negin Miri, the list of Sasanian administrators and their level of authority presented in a hierarchical model was the following:

References

Sources 
 
 
 
 
 
 

Government of the Sasanian Empire
Administrative divisions in Asia
Administrative divisions in Europe
Sasanian Empire